Kureen is a rural locality in the Tablelands Region, Queensland, Australia. In the  Kureen had a population of 122 people.

Geography 
The Millaa Milla branch of the Tablelands railway line enters the locality from the north-east (Peeramon), passes through the Kureen railway station in the centre of the locality and then exits to the south (Malanda). That branch line is now closed and the station dismantled.

History 
The locality takes its name from the Kureen railway station, which was assigned by the Queensland Railways Department on 25 April 1910, and is an Aboriginal word, meaning little fissure or crack.

Kureen State School opened on 5 February 1912 and closed on 1958.

In the  Kureen had a population of 122 people.

Reference 

Tablelands Region
Localities in Queensland